Zviad Endeladze (born 7 April 1966 in Adigeni) is a retired Georgian footballer who played as a forward. He has played for clubs such as Guria Lanchkhuti and Margveti, scoring 40 goals during the 1995–96 season, which made him the top scorer in European domestic competitions and would have won the European Golden Boot had it not been suspended in 1991. The award was reinstated a season after Endeladze's feat under new rules that would count goals scored in the Georgian Top League as one point while goals scored in Europe's top leagues are counted double. He retired from football in 2006.

External links
 
 
 Sport.de 
 

1966 births
Living people
Footballers from Georgia (country)
FC Luch Vladivostok players
Erovnuli Liga players
People from Samtskhe–Javakheti
Association football forwards